The arrondissement of Nantua is an arrondissement of France in the Ain department in the Auvergne-Rhône-Alpes region. It has 62 communes.

Composition

The communes of the arrondissement of Nantua, and their INSEE codes, are:
 
 Apremont (01011)
 Arbent (01014)
 Béard-Géovreissiat (01170)
 Belleydoux (01035)
 Bellignat (01031)
 Billiat (01044)
 Bolozon (01051)
 Boyeux-Saint-Jérôme (01056)
 Brénod (01060)
 Brion (01063)
 Ceignes (01067)
 Cerdon (01068)
 Challes-la-Montagne (01077)
 Champfromier (01081)
 Chanay (01082)
 Charix (01087)
 Chevillard (01101)
 Condamine (01112)
 Confort (01114)
 Dortan (01148)
 Échallon (01152)
 Géovreisset (01171)
 Giron (01174)
 Groissiat (01181)
 Injoux-Génissiat (01189)
 Izenave (01191)
 Izernore (01192)
 Jujurieux (01199)
 Labalme (01200)
 Lantenay (01206)
 Leyssard (01214)
 Maillat (01228)
 Martignat (01237)
 Matafelon-Granges (01240)
 Mérignat (01242)
 Montanges (01257)
 Montréal-la-Cluse (01265)
 Nantua (01269)
 Neuville-sur-Ain (01273)
 Les Neyrolles (01274)
 Nurieux-Volognat (01267)
 Outriaz (01282)
 Oyonnax (01283)
 Peyriat (01293)
 Plagne (01298)
 Le Poizat-Lalleyriat (01204)
 Poncin (01303)
 Pont-d'Ain (01304)
 Port (01307)
 Priay (01314)
 Saint-Alban (01331)
 Saint-Germain-de-Joux (01357)
 Saint-Jean-le-Vieux (01363)
 Saint-Martin-du-Frêne (01373)
 Samognat (01392)
 Serrières-sur-Ain (01404)
 Sonthonnax-la-Montagne (01410)
 Surjoux-Lhopital (01215)
 Valserhône (01033)
 Varambon (01430)
 Vieu-d'Izenave (01441)
 Villes (01448)

History

The arrondissement of Nantua was created in 1800. At the January 2017 reorganization of the arrondissements of Ain, it received four communes from the arrondissement of Bourg-en-Bresse, two from the arrondissement of Gex and one from the arrondissement of Belley, and it lost one commune to the arrondissement of Belley.

As a result of the reorganisation of the cantons of France which came into effect in 2015, the borders of the cantons are no longer related to the borders of the arrondissements. The cantons of the arrondissement of Nantua were, as of January 2015:

 Bellegarde-sur-Valserine 
 Brénod 
 Izernore 
 Nantua 
 Oyonnax-Nord 
 Oyonnax-Sud
 Poncin

References

Nantua